KBJZ-LP (94.1 FM) is a low power FM radio station serving downtown Juneau, Alaska, and parts of the adjacent Douglas Island. The station broadcasts multiple musical genres, ranging from jazz, as its call sign implies, to classic rock and hip-hop. The station is owned by Gastineau Broadcasting Corporation.

References

External links
 
 Recordings of the band Contra Public on Collette Costa's Morning Madame (Google cache

2002 establishments in Alaska
BJZ-LP
Jazz radio stations in the United States
Radio stations established in 2002
BJZ-LP
Variety radio stations in the United States